Arthur J. Pierce was the head football coach for the Middlebury College Panthers football team in 1909. He compiled a record of 2–3.

Head coaching record

References

Year of birth missing
Year of death missing
Middlebury Panthers football coaches